is a railway station on Kintetsu Railway's Kyoto Line located in Minami-ku, Kyoto, Japan. The station provides access to Tō-ji, a nearby Buddhist temple famous for its large pagoda.

Layout
The station has two side platforms serving a track each.

Around the station
 Tōji Temple
Kyoto Computer Gakuin

History
1928 - The station opens as a station of Nara Electric Railroad
1938 - The station is moved 100m towards , and becomes elevated.
1963 - NER merges and the station becomes part of Kintetsu
2007 - Starts using PiTaPa

Adjacent stations

References

External links

 Station Facilities and Service
 Station Map

Railway stations in Japan opened in 1928
Railway stations in Kyoto